Yated, meaning "peg" in Hebrew, can refer to:

Two Haredi newspapers:
Yated Ne'eman (Israel), an Israeli newspaper published in Hebrew.
Yated Ne'eman (United States), an American newspaper published in English.
Yated, Israel, an Israeli moshav

Hebrew words and phrases

he: